Lê Trung Tông (983–1005) was the second emperor under the Early Lê dynasty. He held the throne for only three days in 1005. His reign was considered one of two shortest reigns in Vietnam's history, along with the reign of Dục Đức under the Nguyễn dynasty.

Biography
He was born in 983 to Lê Đại Hành and Concubine Diệu Nữ. His birth name was Lê Long Việt. He was one of ten princes of Lê Đại Hành. After the Crown Prince Long Thâu died, he was chosen as Crown Prince.

In 1005, after Lê Đại Hành died, the princes immediately contested over the throne. The conflicts between the royal princes led to a civil war between these princes for eight months, and the nation fell into anarchy. The main war was between the running crown prince and the oldest surviving prince Long Ngân (the second prince in line to the throne after former crown prince Long Thâu). In October 1005, Long Ngân was defeated and quickly fled to Thạch Hà area, but he was captured and killed by locals. This enabled Long Việt to ascend to the throne.

But after just three days, he was killed by an assassin sent by his brother Lê Long Đĩnh, another rival prince. The assassin merely climbed over the wall, crept into the Emperor's chamber and killed him. As a result, Lê Long Đĩnh was the surviving and undisputed claimant to the royal throne.

Mysterious death
Đại Việt sử ký toàn thư The emperor was killed by his younger brother Long Đĩnh in mysterious circumstances after reigning only 3 days. All the courtiers ran away except for Lý Công Uẩn, who wept and embraced the body of the emperor. Long Đĩnh succeeded the dead emperor.

References

Sources
 Trấn Bạch Đằng, Lê Vǎn Nǎm, Nguyễn Quang Vinh, Vua Lê Đại Hành (Thành Phố Hồ Chí Minh: Nhà Xuất Bản Trẻ), 1998.
 Trấn Bạch Đằng, Lê Vǎn Nǎm, Nguyễn Đức Hòa,  Cờ Lau Vạn Thắng Vủỏng (Thành Phố Hồ Chí Minh: Nhà Xuất Bản Trẻ), 2005.

983 births
1005 deaths
Early Lê dynasty emperors
11th-century Vietnamese monarchs
Vietnamese monarchs